François Baudichon (born in 1812 in Sainte-Maure-de-Touraine) was a French clergyman and bishop for the Roman Catholic Diocese of Taiohae. He was appointed bishop in 1844. He died in 1882.

References 

1812 births
1882 deaths
French Roman Catholic bishops
Roman Catholic bishops of Taiohae